The 1955 Western State Mountaineers football team was an American football team that represented Western State College of Colorado—now known as Western Colorado University—as a member of the Rocky Mountain Conference (RMC) during the 1955 college football season. Led by third-year head coach Pete Pederson, the Mountaineers compiled an overall record of 7–3 with a mark of 6–2 in conference play, placing second in the RMC.

Western State halfback Bill Rhodes ranked second nationally among small college rushing  leaders. He totaled 1,112 rushing yards on 142 carries in 10 games. He also ranked fifth nationally with 1,153 yards of total offense and 13 nationally in punting with an average of 39.0 yards per punt.

Rhodes was also a unanimous pick on the Associated Press (AP) Rocky Mountain Conference all-star team. Quarterback Bob Mears also received first-team honors. End Dick Mikkelsen and center Sam Boyd received second-team honors. Rhodes also received second-team honors from the AP on its Little All-America team.

Schedule

References

Western State
Western Colorado Mountaineers football seasons
Western State Mountaineers football